Sola Airport may refer to:

Another name for Vanua Lava Airport in Vanuatu
Stavanger Airport, Sola in Norway